Theodoros or Theodorus  is a masculine given name, from which Theodore is derived. The feminine version is Theodora. 
It may refer to:

Ancient world
Ordered chronologically
 Theodorus of Samos, 6th-century BC Greek sculptor, architect and inventor
 Theodorus of Cyrene, 5th-century BC Libyan Greek mathematician
 Theodorus of Byzantium, late 5th-century BC Greek sophist and orator
 Theodorus the Atheist (c. 340–c. 250 BC), Libyan Greek philosopher
 Theodorus of Athamania, King of a tribe in Epirus
 Theodorus (meridarch), civil governor of the Swat province of the Indo-Greek kingdom
 Theodorus of Gadara, 1st-century BC Greek rhetorician
 Theodorus of Asine, Greek Neoplatonist philosopher
 Theodorus of Tabennese (c. 314–368), Egyptian Christian monk
 Theodorus (usurper), Roman usurper against Emperor Valens
 Theodorus Priscianus, 4th-century physician at Constantinople
 Theodorus I (bishop of Milan) (died 490)
 Theodorus (consul 505), Roman politician
 Theodorus Lector, Byzantine scholar and historian
 Theodore Rshtuni (590-654/655), Armenian nobleman who fought against the first Arab invasions of Armenia
 Pope Theodoros I of Alexandria, 45th Coptic Pope of Alexandria and Patriarch of the See of St. Mark (730–742) (also known as Theodosius II)
 Saint Theodorus (c. 775–c. 842), monk from Jerusalem
 Theodore Balsamon, 12th-century Eastern Orthodox Patriarch of Antioch
 Theodore I Laskaris, Emperor of Nicaea (1204–1221 or 1205–1222)
 Theodore II Laskaris, Emperor of Nicaea (1254–1258)
 Theodore Hyrtakenos (fl. 1300), Byzantine court official and writer
 Theodore II Palaiologos (c. 1396–1448), Despot in the Morea
 Theodoros Pelecanos of Corfu, Greek scribe

Modern world
Ordered by last name, where available
 Pope Tawadros II of Alexandria (born 1952), current Coptic Pope of Alexandria and Patriarch of the See of St. Mark
 Patriarch Theodore II of Alexandria (born 1954), current Eastern Orthodox Patriarch of Alexandria and all Africa
 Theo Angelopoulos (1935–2012), Greek filmmaker, screenwriter and producer
 Theodorus Bailey (politician) (1758–1828), United States senator from New York
 Theodorus Bailey (officer) (1805–1877), United States Navy rear admiral
 Theodorus W. Brevard (1804–1877), American comptroller
 Theodorus Frederik van Capellen (1762–1824), Dutch naval officer
 Theodorus van der Croon (1668–1739), Dutch Archbishop of Utrecht 
 Theodorus Dekker (1927–2021), Dutch mathematician
 Theodoros Diligiannis (1820–1905), Greek politician, five times Prime Minister of Greece
 Theodorus Jacobus Frelinghuysen (c. 1691–c. 1747), German-American minister and theologian
 Theodorus Jacobus Frelinghuysen II (1724–1761), New York theologian
 Theodorus Janssonius van Almeloveen (1657–1712), Dutch physician
 Theodorus Klompe (1903–1963), Dutch geologist
 Theodoros Kolokotronis (1770–1843), Greek general and preeminent leader of the Greek War of Independence
 Theodorus van Kooten (1749–1813), Dutch poet, professor and politician
 Theodorus B. M. Mason (1848–1899), American founder of the Office of Naval Intelligence
 Theodorus Bailey Myers (1821–1888), American collector of books and historical manuscripts
 Theodoros Natsinas (1872–1949), Greek teacher
 Theodoros Negris (1790–1824), Greek politician
 Theodorus Netscher (1661–1728), Dutch painter
 Theodoros G. Orphanides (1817–1886), Greek botanist
 Theodoros Pangalos (general) (1878–1952), Greek general, dictator in 1925–26
 Theodoros Pangalos (politician) (born 1938), Greek politician, foreign minister and deputy prime minister of Greece
 Theodoros Papagiannis (born 1942), Greek sculptor
 Theodoros Papaloukas (born 1977), Greek basketball player
 Theodorus Marinus Roest (1832–1898), Dutch numismatist 
 Theodorus Marinus Roest van Limburg (1806–1887), Dutch journalist, diplomat, and politician
 Theodoros Roussopoulos (born 1963), Greek politician
 Theodorus Johannes Schoon (1915–1985), Dutch-New Zealand artist, photographer and carver 
 Theodorus Schrevelius (1572–1649), Dutch writer and poet
 Theodorus Skuminowicz (died 1668), Lithuanian Bishop of Vilnius
 Theodoros Stamos (1922–1997), Greek-American painter
 Theodoros Tripotseris (born 1986), Greek footballer
 Theodoros Tzinis (1798–1869), Greek fighter in the Greek War of Independence
 Theodoros Vasilakakis (born 1988), Greek footballer
 Theodoros Velkos (born 1976), Greek badminton player
 Theodoros Voutiritsas (born 1962), Greek football manager and former player
 Theodoros Vryzakis (1819–1878), Greek painter
 Theodoros Zagorakis (born 1971), Greek politician and former footballer
 Theodoros Ziakas (1798–1882), Greek fighter in the Greek War of Independence

Greek masculine given names
Dutch masculine given names